This is list of locations in the United States named after places in Wales. A number of places in the U.S have been named after places in Wales by Welsh settlers and explorers. and are mainly in the 13 eastern states which used to be the Thirteen Colonies in the British Empire. A number of US towns such as Newport and Newtown maybe named after the similarly names Welsh towns or may have been named solely because of their location. Only those places where there is an evidential link with Wales are included here.

 Bala Cynwyd, Pennsylvania named after Bala, Gwynedd
 Berwyn Township, Custer County, Nebraska named after Berwyn
 Berwyn Heights, Maryland
 Berwyn, Illinois
 Berwyn, Nebraska
 Berwyn, Pennsylvania
 Bangor, Maine  named after Bangor, Gwynedd
 Bryn Mawr, California named after Brynmawr
 Bryn Mawr, Chicago, Illinois
 Bryn Mawr, Minneapolis
 Bryn Mawr, Pennsylvania
 Bryn Mawr, Raleigh 
 Bryn Mawr-Skyway, Washington
 Caernarvon Township, Berks County, Pennsylvania named after Caernarfon
 Caernarvon, Louisiana
 Dillwyn, Virginia
 Havertown, Pennsylvania named after Haverfordwest
 Cardiff, New York named after Cardiff
 Flint, Michigan named after Fflint
 Lampeter, Pennsylvania named after Lampeter
 Lower Gwynedd Township, Montgomery County, Pennsylvania named after Gwynedd
 Montgomery, California
 Montgomery, Illinois
 Montgomery, Iowa
 Montgomery, Kentucky
 Montgomery, Louisiana
 Montgomery, Massachusetts
 Montgomery, Michigan
 Montgomery, Minnesota
 Montgomery, New York
 Montgomery County, New York
 Montgomery, Ohio
 Montgomery, Pennsylvania
 Montgomery, Tennessee
 Montgomery, Texas
 Montgomery, Vermont
 Montgomery, West Virginia
 Montgomery City, Missouri
 Montgomery Creek, California
 Montgomery Village, Maryland
 Pembrey, Delaware named after Pembrey
 Pembroke, Massachusetts, named after Pembroke, Wales
 Radnor, Indiana named after Radnorshire
 Radnor, Pennsylvania 
 Radnor Township, Delaware County, Pennsylvania
 Radnor, Ohio 
 Swansea, Massachusetts named after Swansea
 Upper Gwynedd Township, Montgomery County, Pennsylvania
 Wales, Massachusetts
 Wales, Utah

References

Welsh place names in other countries
Welsh